Agononida callirrhoe is a species of squat lobster in the family Munididae. The species name is derived from Callirroe, one of the Oceanids in Greek mythology.

References

Squat lobsters
Crustaceans described in 1994